Uncut is a Canadian indie rock band from Toronto.  They have released two 12" singles and three full-length albums.

History
Uncut formed as a duo consisting of Ian Worang and Jake Fairley in 2001. After the pair had released a 12" recording, Understanding The New Violence, in 2002, Fairley left to pursue a career as a DJ.

Worang developed Uncut into a full band with guitarists Chris McCann and Sam Goldberg, drummer Jon Drew and bassist Derek Tokar. After performing around southern Ontario, in 2004 Uncut released the album Those Who Were Hung Hang Here on Paper Bag Records. The band also released a single, Devotion.

In 2005, Uncut completed a short tour, after which the band recorded and released Modern Currencies in 2006. The album included songwriting by Worang, Tokar and Goldberg, as well as some backing vocals from Melissa Auf der Maur.

Uncut continues to perform, and in 2013 released a third album, Infinite Repeats.

Worang died in December 2021, at the age of 47.

Band members
Ian Worang (Guitar, Vocals)
Chris McCann (Guitar, Vocals)
Jon Drew (Drums)
Derek Tokar (Bass, Vocals)

Discography
 Understanding The New Violence (12"), 2002
 Devotion/Fluent And Pure/Over The Edge (12"), 2004
 Those Who Were Hung Hang Here, 2004
 Modern Currencies, 2006
 Infinite Repeats, 2013

References

External links
Official Site
Uncut on Bandcamp
Paper Bag Records
 

Canadian indie rock groups
Musical groups from Toronto
Paper Bag Records artists
Musical groups with year of establishment missing